Echinocereus pentalophus, with the common name ladyfinger cactus, is a species of Echinocereus cactus, in the tribe Echinocereeae Tribe. It is native to North America.

Subspecies 
 Echinocereus pentalophus subsp. leonensis 
 Echinocereus pentalophus subsp. pentalophus
 Echinocereus pentalophus subsp. procumbens

Distribution
The cactus species is found from San Luis Potosí state, through Northeastern Mexico, and into the southern Rio Grande Valley in southeastern Texas.

References

External links

pentalophus
Cacti of Mexico
Cacti of the United States
Flora of Northeastern Mexico
Flora of San Luis Potosí
Flora of Texas
Flora of the Rio Grande valleys